37 Days is a British drama miniseries that was first broadcast on BBC Two from 6 to 8 March 2014. The three-part miniseries covers the 37 days before World War I, from the assassination of Archduke Franz Ferdinand of Austria on 28 June 1914 to the United Kingdom declaring war on Germany on 4 August 1914.

Cast

 Ian McDiarmid as Edward Grey
 Nicholas Farrell as Eyre Crowe
 Tim Pigott-Smith as Herbert Henry Asquith
 Sinéad Cusack as Margot Asquith
 Bill Paterson as Lord Morley
 Kenneth Cranham as John Burns
 Ludger Pistor as Bethmann-Hollweg
 Rainer Sellien as Kaiser Wilhelm II
 Bernhard Schütz as Helmuth Moltke
 Mark Lewis Jones as David Lloyd George
 Nicholas Asbury as Winston Churchill
 Urs Remond as Prince Lichnowsky
 James McArdle as Alec
 André Kaczmarczyk as Jens
 Holger Kunkel as Falkenhayn
 Stephan Szasz as Jagow
 Kate Ambler as Muriel
 François-Éric Gendron as Paul Cambon
 Niall Cusack as Benckendorff
 George Lenz as Mensdorff
 Chris Kelly as Gavrilo Princip
 Oliver Ford Davies as Cunliffe
 Patrick Fitzsymons as King George V
 Ian Beattie as Tsar Nicholas II
 Simon Coury as Franz Ferdinand
 Rainer Reiners as Von Below
 Gordon Fulton as Sukhomlinov
 Mary Moulds as Sophie Chotek
 Christopher Leveaux as Lieutenant Feldmann

Production
The series was shot entirely in Belfast, Northern Ireland. It is part of the BBC World War I centenary season and was first announced by Janice Hadlow, the controller of BBC Two, on 22 August 2013. The series seeks to quash assumptions about the war's inevitability, such as the Sarajevo shooting making the war inevitable.

Writer and producers Mark Hayhurst and Sue Horth compiled a 175-page book tracing "every conference, every telephone call, private letter and telegram swirling around Europe" before writing the script.

Episode list

Reception
The series was positively reviewed by critics.

In a four-star review for The Times, Andrew Billen called the series "a clear and often brilliant dramatisation" and praised McDiarmid's portrayal of Grey as "surely one of the actor's greatest performances" though he found "the humour becomes slightly broader" in the scenes set in Berlin and Vienna and that the subplot of the two clerks "rather peters out".

In a four of five-star review for The Telegraph, Christopher Howse found the series "enthralling" but was distracted by the use of the Belfast City Hall as a location for Whitehall.

Andrew Anthony of The Guardian called the series a "meticulous rendering" and "impressively wordy and careful imagining" free of "romantic digressions or fictional appeals to sentiment", with a "strong performance" by McDiarmid; he also found the drama "rigid and simplistic" with "dubious stereotypes and an excess of rhetorical dialogue".

In The Independent, Ellen Jones wrote the series' "masterstroke" was "to reframe this history textbook timeline as a subtle character study", praising its "terrifically well written" dialogue.

References

External links
 
 
 

BBC high definition shows
2010s British drama television series
2014 British television series debuts
2014 British television series endings
Television shows set in London
Television shows set in Berlin
World War I television drama series
2010s British television miniseries
Films shot in Northern Ireland
English-language television shows
Cultural depictions of Archduke Franz Ferdinand of Austria
Cultural depictions of Gavrilo Princip
Works about the assassination of Archduke Franz Ferdinand of Austria
Cultural depictions of Wilhelm II
Cultural depictions of David Lloyd George
Cultural depictions of Winston Churchill
Cultural depictions of Nicholas II of Russia